Sara Guadalupe Figueroa Canedo (born 17 February 1956) is a Mexican politician from the Ecologist Green Party of Mexico. From 2000 to 2003 she served as Deputy of the LVIII Legislature of the Mexican Congress representing the Federal District.

References

1956 births
Living people
Politicians from Mexico City
Women members of the Chamber of Deputies (Mexico)
Ecologist Green Party of Mexico politicians
21st-century Mexican politicians
21st-century Mexican women politicians
Deputies of the LVIII Legislature of Mexico
Members of the Chamber of Deputies (Mexico) for Mexico City
Universidad Iberoamericana alumni